USCGC Morro Bay (WTGB-106) is the sixth vessel of the s built in 1980 and operated by the United States Coast Guard. The ship was named after a seaside city in San Luis Obispo County, California.

Design 

The  Bay-class tugboats operated primarily for domestic ice breaking duties. They are named after American bays and are stationed mainly in the northeast United States and the Great Lakes.

WTGBs use a low pressure air hull lubrication or bubbler system that forces air and water between the hull and ice. This system improves icebreaking capabilities by reducing resistance against the hull, reducing horsepower requirements.

Construction and career 
Morro Bay was laid down by the Tacoma Boatbuilding Co., in Tacoma, Washington on 6 August 1979. She was launched on 11 July 1980 and later commissioned at the Reserve Training Center in Yorktown, Virginia, on 28 March 1981. She served at Yorktown until 1998 and then at New London, Connecticut, before she was reassigned to Cleveland, Ohio in the summer of 2014.

On 2 July 2008, Morro Bay was returning to New London when she collided with a Block Island ferry.

In May 2018, Morro Bay arrived at the Great Lakes Shipyard for repairs and maintenance.

On 13 June 2021, while the museum ship  was being towed out of Cleveland for repairs, Morro Bay collided with Cod at 11:30 a.m., though damage to the vessels was minor.

Awards 

 Coast Guard Presidential Unit Citation 
 Transportation 9-11 Ribbon
 Coast Guard Unit Commendation 
 Coast Guard Meritorious Unit Commendation 
 Coast Guard Bicentennial Unit Commendation 
 National Defense Service Medal with star
 Global War on Terrorism Service Medal  
 Humanitarian Service Medal 
 Coast Guard Special Operations Service Ribbon 
 Coast Guard Sea Service Ribbon

References

United States Coast Guard home page
United States Coast Guard Reservist Magazine

External links 

 United States Coast Guard: Morro Bay
 TogetherWeServed: Morro Bay Crew Members

Morro Bay
1980 ships
Ships built in Tacoma, Washington